The following outline is provided as an overview of and topical guide to chess:

Chess is a two-player board game played on a chessboard (a square-checkered board with 64 squares arranged in an eight-by-eight grid). In a chess game, each player begins with sixteen pieces: one king, one queen, two rooks, two knights, two bishops, and eight pawns. The object of the game is to checkmate the opponent's king, whereby the king is under immediate attack (in "check") and there is no way to remove or defend it from attack, or force the opposing player to forfeit.

Nature of chess
Chess can be described as all of the following:
 Form of entertainment – form of activity that holds the attention and interest of an audience, or gives pleasure and delight.
 Form of recreation – activity of leisure, leisure being discretionary time.
 Form of play – voluntary, intrinsically motivated activity normally associated with recreational pleasure and enjoyment.
 Game – structured playing, usually undertaken for enjoyment and sometimes used as an educational tool. Games are distinct from work, which is usually carried out for remuneration, and from art, which is more often an expression of aesthetic or ideological elements. However, the distinction is not clear-cut, and many games are also considered to be work (such as professional players of spectator sports/games) or art (such as jigsaw puzzles or games involving an artistic layout such as Mahjong, solitaire, or some video games).
 Board game – game in which counters or pieces are placed, removed, or moved on a premarked surface or "board" according to a set of rules. Games may be based on pure strategy, chance or a mixture of the two and usually have a goal which a player aims to achieve.
 Strategy game – game (e.g. computer, video or board game) in which the players' uncoerced, and often autonomous decision-making skills have a high significance in determining the outcome. Almost all strategy games require internal decision tree style thinking, and typically very high situation awareness.
 Two-player game – game played by just two players, usually against each other.
 Sport – form of play, but sport is also a category of entertainment in its own right (see immediately below for description)
 Sport – organized, competitive, entertaining, and skillful activity requiring commitment, strategy, and fair play, in which a winner can be defined by objective means. It is governed by a set of rules or customs. Chess is recognized as a sport by the International Olympic Committee.
 Mind sport – game where the outcome is determined mainly by mental skill, rather than by pure chance.

Chess equipment

Essential equipment 
 Chessboard – board with 64 squares (eight rows and eight columns) arranged in two alternating colors (light and dark). The colors are called "black" and "white", although the actual colors vary: usually they are dark green and buff for boards used in competition, and often natural shades of light and dark woods for home boards. Chess boards can be built into chess tables, or dispensed with (along with pieces) if playing mental chess, computer chess, Internet chess and sometimes correspondence chess.
  – horizontal row of squares on the chessboard.
  – vertical (i.e. in the direction from one player to the other) column of squares on the chessboard.

 Chess set – all the pieces required to play a game of chess. Chess sets come in various materials and styles, and some are considered collectors' items and works of art. The most popular style for competitive play is the Staunton chess set, named after Howard Staunton, which are described below; some regions have alternate standard shapes for some pieces. The relative point values given are approximate and depend on the current game situation.
 Chess pieces – two armies of 16 chess pieces, one army designated "white", the other "black". Each player controls one of the armies for the entire game. The pieces in each army include:
 1 king – most important piece, and one of the weakest (until the endgame). The object of the game is checkmate, by placing the enemy king in check in a way that it cannot escape capture in the next move. On the top of the piece is a cross.
 1 queen – most powerful piece in the game, with a relative value of 9 points. The top of the piece is crown-like. Official tournament chess sets have 2 queens of each color, to deal with pawns being promoted 
 2 rooks – look like castle towers and have a relative value of 5 points each.
 2 bishops – stylized after mitres (bishops' hats), and have a relative value of 3 points each.
 2 knights – usually look like horse heads and have a relative value of 3 points each.
 8 pawns – smallest pieces in the game, each topped by a ball. Pawns have a relative value of 1 point each.

Specialized equipment 

 Game clock – dual timer used to monitor each player's thinking time. Only the timer of the player who is to move is active. Used for speed chess, and to regulate time in tournament games.
  and writing implement – Tournament games require scores to be kept, and many players like to record other games for later analysis.

Rules of chess 
The modern rules of chess (and breaking them) are discussed in separate articles, and briefly in the following subsections:
 Rules of chess – rules governing the play of the game of chess.
 White and Black in chess – one set of pieces is designated "white" and the other is designated "black". White moves first. Some older sets had white and red, some modern sets have tan and brown.
 Cheating in chess – methods that have been used to gain an unfair advantage by breaking the rules.

Initial set up 
 Initial set up – initial placement of the pieces on the chessboard before any moves are made.

Moves 
  – move of a piece to a square occupied by an opposing piece, which is removed from the board and from play.
 Check – situation in which the king would be subject to capture (but the king is never actually captured).
 Checkmate – a winning move which makes capture of the opposing king inevitable.

How each piece moves 
 Moving a pawn – pawns move straight forward one space at a time, but capture diagonally (within a one-square range). On its first move, a pawn may move two squares forward instead (with no capturing allowed in a two-square move). Also, pawns are subject to the en passant and promotion movement rules (see below).
 En passant – on the very next move after a player moves a pawn two squares forward from its starting position, an opposing pawn that is guarding the skipped square may capture the pawn (taking it "as it passes"), by moving to the passed square as if the pawn had stopped there. If this is not done on the very next move, the right to do so is lost.
 Pawn promotion – when a pawn reaches its eighth rank it is exchanged for the player's choice of a queen, rook, bishop or knight (usually a queen, since it is the most powerful piece).
 Moving a knight – knights move two squares horizontally and one square vertically from their original position, or two squares vertically and one square horizontally, jumping directly to the destination while ignoring any pieces in the intervening spaces.
 Moving a bishop – bishops move any distance in a straight line in either direction along squares connected diagonally. One bishop in each army moves diagonally on white squares only, and the other bishop is restricted to moving along black squares.
 Moving a rook – rook may move any distance along a rank or a file (forward, backward, left, or right), and can also be used for castling (see below).
 Castling – special move available to each player once in the game (with restrictions, see below) where the king is moved two squares to the left or right and the rook on that side is moved to the other side of the king.
 Requirements for castling – Castling is legal if the following conditions are all met:
 1. Neither the king nor the rook involved have previously moved.
 2. There are no pieces in between the king and chosen rook.
 3. The king is not currently in check. (For clarification, the involved rook may be currently under attack. Additionally, the king may have previously been in check, as long as the king did not move to resolve it.)
 4. The king does not pass through a square that is under attack by an enemy piece. (For clarification, the rook may pass through a square that is under attack by an enemy piece; the only such square is the one adjacent to the rook when castling queenside, b1 for White and b8 for Black.)
 5. The king does not end in a square that is under attack by an enemy piece.
 Moving the queen – queen can move like a rook or like a bishop (horizontally, vertically, or diagonally), but no castling.
 Moving the king – king may move one square in any direction, but may not move into check. It may also make a special move called "castling" (see above).

End of the game 
 Resigning – a player may end the game by resigning, which cedes victory to the opponent.
 Checkmate – object of the game – a king is in check and has no move to get out of check, losing the game.
 Draw – neither side wins or loses. In competition this usually counts as a half-win for each player.
 Draw by agreement – players may agree that the game is a draw.
 Stalemate – if the player whose turn it is to move has no legal move and is not in check, the game is a draw by stalemate.
 Fifty-move rule – if within the last fifty moves by both sides, no pawn has moved and there have been no captures, a player may claim a draw.
 Threefold repetition – if the same position has occurred three times with the same player to move, a player may claim a draw.
 Perpetual check – situation in which one king cannot escape an endless series of checks but cannot be checkmated. This was formerly a rule of chess to result in a draw, and still used informally, but superseded by the threefold repetition rule and fifty-move rule, which make it implicit.

Competition rules and other features 
 Adjournment – play stops, and the game is resumed later. This has become rare since the advent of computer analysis of chess games.
 Chess notation – system of recording chess moves.
 Algebraic chess notation – most common method of recording moves.
 Descriptive chess notation – obsolete method of recording moves, it was widely used, especially in English- and Spanish-speaking countries, and is still sometimes seen.
 Draw by agreement – the two players agree to call the game a draw, as neither is likely to win.
 Time control – each player must complete either a specified number of moves or all of his moves before a certain time elapses on his game clock.
 Touch-move rule – if a player touches his own piece, he must move it if it has a legal move. If he touches an opponent's piece, he must capture it if he can legally.

Minor variants 
 Blindfold chess – one or both players play without seeing the board and pieces.
 Chess handicap – one of the players gives a handicap to the other player, usually starting the game without a certain piece.
 Fast chess – chess played with a time control limiting each player to a specified time of 60 minutes or less (can be as low as 1 minute).

Gameplay 
 Blunder – very bad move.
 Candidate move – move that upon initial observation of the position, warrants further analysis. Spotting these moves is the key to higher-level play.
 Compensation – having positional advantages in spite of  disadvantages.
 Chess handicap – way to enable a weaker player to have a chance of winning against a stronger one. There are a variety of such handicaps, such as material odds (the stronger player surrenders a certain piece or pieces), extra moves (the weaker player has an agreed number of extra moves at the beginning of the game), extra time on the chess clock, and special conditions (such as requiring the odds-giver to deliver checkmate with a specified piece or pawn). Various permutations of these, such as "pawn and two moves", are also possible.
 Chess piece relative value – relative value of chess pieces, based on their relative power.
 Premove – used in fast online games, it refers to a player making his next move while his opponent is thinking about his move. After the opponent's move, the premove will be made, if legal, taking only 0.1 seconds on the game clock.
 Priyome – typical maneuver or technique in chess.
 Ply – half-turn, that is, one player's portion of a turn.
 Tempo – a "unit" similar to time, equal to one chess move, e.g. to lose a tempo is to waste a move or give the opponent the opportunity of an extra move. Sometimes a player may want to lose a tempo.

General situations 
 En prise – when an unguarded piece is in position to be captured.
 Initiative – situational advantage in which a player can make threats that cannot be ignored, forcing the opponent to use his turns to respond to threats rather than make his own.
 Transposition – sequence of moves resulting in a position which may also be reached by another common sequence of moves. Transpositions are particularly common in openings, where a given position may be reached by different sequences of moves. Players sometimes use transpositions deliberately in order to avoid variations they dislike, lure opponents into unfamiliar or uncomfortable territory or simply to worry opponents.
 Time trouble – having little thinking time left in a timed game, thereby increasing the likelihood of making weak or losing moves or overlooking strong or winning moves.
 Zugzwang – situation in which a player would prefer to pass and make no move, because he has no move that does not worsen his position.

Pawn structure 
Pawn structure – describes features of the positions of the pawns. Pawn structure may be used for tactical or strategic effect, or both.
 Backward pawn – pawn that is not supported by other pawns and cannot advance.
 Connected pawns – pawns of the same color on adjacent files so that they can protect each other.
 Doubled pawns – two pawns of the same color on the same file, so that one blocks the other.
 Half-open file – file that has pawns of one color only.
 Isolated pawn – pawn with no pawns of the same color on adjacent files.
 Maróczy Bind – formation with white pawns on c4 and e4, after the exchange of White's d-pawn for Black's c-pawn.
 Open file – file void of pawns.
 Passed pawn – pawn that can advance to its eighth rank without being blocked by an opposing pawn and without the possibility of being captured by a pawn on an adjacent file.

Chess tactics 
Chess tactics – a chess tactic is a move or sequence of moves which may result in tangible gain or limits the opponent's options. Tactics are usually contrasted with strategy, in which advantages take longer to be realized, and the opponent is less constrained in responding.
 Anti-computer tactics – tactics used by humans in games against computers that the program cannot handle very well
  – to remove an opposing piece from the board by taking it with one of your own. Except in the case of an en passant capture, the capturing man replaces the captured man on its square. Also, a move that captures. Captures can be executed offensively or defensively.
 Combination – series of moves, often with an exchange or sacrifice, to achieve some advantage.
 Exchange – capturing a piece in return for allowing another piece to be captured.
 The exchange – exchange of a bishop or knight for a rook. The rook is generally the stronger piece unless a player obtains other advantages for allowing the exchange.
 Flight square – square that the king can retreat to, if attacked.

Fundamental tactics 
Fundamental tactics include:
 Battery – two or more pieces that can move and attack along a shared path, situated on the same rank, file, or diagonal; e.g., the queen and a bishop, or the queen and a rook, or both rooks, or the queen and both rooks.
 Block (blocking an attack) – interposing a piece between another piece and its attacker. When the piece being attacked is the king, this is blocking a check.
 Deflection – tactic that forces an opposing piece to leave the square, rank or file it occupies, thus exposing the king or a valuable piece.
 Discovered attack – moving a piece uncovers an attack by another piece along a straight line
 Fork – attack on two or more pieces by one piece
 Interference – blocking the line along which an enemy piece is defended, leaving it vulnerable to capture.
 Overloading – giving a defensive piece an additional defensive assignment which it cannot complete without abandoning its original defensive assignment.
 Pin – piece is under attack and either cannot legally move because it would put its king in check or should not move because it will allow an attack on a more valuable piece.
 Skewer – if a piece under attack moves it will allow an attack on another piece
 Undermining – capturing a defensive piece, leaving one of the opponent's pieces undefended or underdefended. Also known as "removal of the guard".
 X-ray – (1) synonym for skewer. The term is also sometimes used to refer to a tactic where a piece either (2) indirectly attacks an enemy piece through another piece or pieces or (3) defends a friendly piece through an enemy piece.

Offensive tactics 
 Battery – two or more pieces that can move and attack along a shared path, situated on the same rank, file, or diagonal; e.g., the queen and a bishop, or the queen and a rook, or both rooks, or the queen and both rooks.
 Alekhine's gun – formation named after the former World Chess Champion, Alexander Alekhine, which consists of placing the two rooks stacked one behind another and the queen at the rear.
 Cross-check – tactic in which a check is played in response to a check, especially when the original check is blocked by a piece that itself either delivers check or reveals a discovered check from another piece.
 Decoy – ensnaring a piece, usually the king or queen, by forcing it to move to a poisoned square with a sacrifice on that square.
 Deflection – forces an opposing piece to leave the square, rank or file it occupies, thus exposing the king or a valuable piece.
 Discovered attack – attack revealed when one piece moves out of the way of another.
 Discovered check – discovered attack that is also a check
 Domination – occurs when a piece has a relatively wide choice of destination squares, but nevertheless cannot avoid being captured.
 Double attack – attack on two pieces at once, such as in a fork, or via a discovered attack where the piece that was blocked attacks one piece while the piece moving out of the way threatens another.
 Double check – check delivered by two pieces at the same time. In chess notation, it is sometimes symbolized by "++".
 Fork – when a piece attacks two or more enemy pieces at the same time.
 Interference – interrupting the line between an attacked piece and its defender by sacrificially interposing a piece. Opportunities for interference are rare because the defended object must be more valuable than the sacrificed piece, and the interposition must itself represent a threat.
 King walk – several successive movements of the king, usually in the endgame to get it from a safe square (where it was hiding during the middlegame) to a more active position. Not to be confused with "king hunt", where a player forces his opponent's king out of safety and chases it across the board with a series of checks.
 Outpost – square where a piece can attack the opponent's position without being attacked by enemy pawns. Knights are good pieces to occupy outposts.
 Overloading – giving a defensive piece an additional defensive assignment which it cannot complete without abandoning its original defensive assignment.
 Pawn promotion – moving a pawn to the back row to be promoted to a knight, a bishop, a rook, or a queen. While this is a rule, it is also a type of move, with tactical significance. Pawn promotion, or the threat of it, often decides the result of a chess endgame.
 Underpromotion – promotion to a knight, bishop, or rook is known as an "underpromotion". Although these pieces are less powerful than the queen, there are some situations where it is advantageous to underpromote. For example, since the knight moves in a way which the queen cannot, knight underpromotions can be very useful, and are the most common type of underpromotion. Promoting to a rook or bishop is advantageous in cases where promoting to a queen would result in an immediate stalemate.
 In FIDE tournament play, spare queens are provided, one of each colour.  In a tournament match between Emil Szalanczy and Thi Mai Hung Nguyen in Budapest, 2009, six queens were on the board at the same time.
 Pawn storm – several pawns are moved in rapid succession toward the opponent's defenses.
 Pin – piece is under attack and either cannot legally move because it would put its king in check or should not move because it will allow an attack on a more valuable piece.
 Absolute pin – pin against the king is called absolute since the pinned piece cannot legally move (as moving it would expose the king to check).
 Relative pin – where the piece shielded by the pinned piece is a piece other than the king, but typically more valuable than the pinned piece.
 Partial pin – when a rook or queen is pinned along a file or rank, or a bishop or queen is pinned along a diagonal
 Situational pin – when a pinned piece is shielding a square and moving out of the way will allow the enemy to move there, resulting in a detrimental situation for the player of the pinned piece, such as checkmate.
 Sacrifice – move which deliberately allows the loss of material, either because the player can win the material back or deliver checkmate if it is taken (sham sacrifice or pseudosacrifice), or because the player judges he will have positional compensation (true or positional sacrifice).
 Greek gift sacrifice – typical sacrifice of a bishop by White playing Bxh7+ or Black playing Bxh2+.
 Queen sacrifice – sacrifice of the queen, invariably tactical in nature.
 Plachutta – a piece sacrifices itself on a square where it could be captured by two different pieces in order to deflect them both from crucial squares.
 Skewer – attack upon two pieces in a line and is similar to a pin. In fact, a skewer is sometimes described as a "reverse pin"; the difference is that in a skewer, the more valuable piece is in front of the piece of lesser or equal value.
 Absolute skewer – when the King is skewered, forcing him to move out of check, exposing the piece behind him in the line of attack.
 Relative skewer – the skewered piece can be moved, but doesn't have to be (because it is not the King in check).
 Swindle – ruse by which a player in a losing position tricks his opponent, and thereby achieves a win or draw instead of the expected loss. It may also refer more generally to obtaining a win or draw from a clearly losing position.
 The exchange – see § Chess tactics above
 Triangulation – technique of making three moves to wind up in the same position while the opponent has to make two moves to wind up in the same position. The reason is to lose a tempo and put the opponent in zugzwang.
 Undermining – capturing a defensive piece, leaving one of the opponent's pieces undefended or underdefended. Also known as "removal of the guard".
 Windmill – repeated series of discovered checks which the opponent cannot avoid, winning large amounts of material.
 X-ray attack – indirect attack of a piece through another piece.
 Zwischenzug ("Intermediate move") – To make an intermediate move before the expected move to gain an advantage.

Checkmate patterns 
Checkmate pattern – a particular checkmate. Some checkmate patterns occur sufficiently frequently, or are otherwise of such interest to scholars, that they have acquired specific names in chess commentary. Here are some of the most notorious:
 Back-rank checkmate – checkmate accomplished by a rook or queen on the opponent's first rank, because the king is blocked in by its own pieces (almost always pawns) on its second rank.
 Bishop and knight checkmate – fundamental checkmate with a minimum amount of material. It is notoriously difficult to achieve.
 Boden's Mate – checkmate pattern characterized by a king being mated by two bishops on criss-crossing diagonals, with possible flight squares blocked by friendly pieces.
 Fool's mate – shortest possible checkmate, on Black's second move. It is rare in practice.
 Scholar's mate – checkmate in as few as four moves by a player accomplished by a queen supported by a bishop (usually) in an attack on the f7 or f2 square. It is fairly common at the novice level.
 Smothered mate – checkmate accomplished by only a knight because the king's own pieces occupy squares to which it would be able to escape.

Defensive tactics 
 Artificial castling (also known as "castling by hand") – taking several moves to get the king to the position it would be in if castling could have been done.
 Block (blocking an attack) – interposing a piece between another piece and its attacker. When the piece being attacked is the king, this is blocking a check.
 Blockade – to block a passed pawn with a piece.
 Desperado – piece that seems determined to give itself up, typically either (1) to sell itself as dearly as possible in a situation where both sides have hanging pieces or (2) to bring about stalemate if it is captured (or in some instances, to force a draw by threefold repetition if it is not captured).
 Luft – German for "air", meaning squares available for the king to escape an attack, typically through a fortress.
 X-ray defense – indirect defense of a piece through another piece.

Possible responses to an attack 
 Capture the attacking piece
 Move the attacked piece
 Block – interpose another piece in between the two
 Guard the attacked piece and permit an exchange
 Pin the attacking piece so the capture becomes illegal or unprofitable
 Use a zwischenzug
 Create a counter-threat

Chess strategy 
Chess strategy – aspect of chess playing concerned with evaluation of chess positions and setting of goals and long-term plans for future play. While evaluating a position strategically, a player must take into account such factors as the relative value of the pieces on the board, pawn structure, king safety, position of pieces, and control of key squares and groups of squares (e.g. diagonals, open files, individual squares).
 Corresponding squares – usually used as a tool in king and pawn endgames, a pair of corresponding squares are such that if one king is on one of them, the opposing king needs to be on the other.
 Fianchetto – moving the pawn in front of the knight and placing the bishop on that square.
 Permanent brain – thinking when it is the opponent's turn to move.
 Prophylaxis – move that prevents some tactical moves by the opponent.
 First-move advantage in chess – theory that White's having the first move gives him an advantage.

Schools of chess
School of chess – group of players that share common ideas about the strategy of the game. There have been several schools in the history of modern chess. Today there is less dependence on schools – players draw on many sources and play according to their personal style.
Modenese Masters – school of chess thought based on teachings of 18th century Italian masters, it emphasized an attack on the opposing king.
Hypermodernism – school of thought based on ideas of some early 20th century masters. Rather than occupying the center of the board with pawns in the opening, control the center by attacking it with knights and bishops from the side.

Game phases 
 Chess opening – first phase of the game, where pieces are developed before the main battle begins.
 Chess middlegame – second phase of the game, usually where the main battle is. Many games end in the middlegame.
 Chess endgame – third and final phase of the game, where there are only a few pieces left.

Chess openings 
Chess opening – group of initial moves of a chess game. Recognized sequences of opening moves are referred to as openings as finished by White, or defenses as finished by Black, but opening is also used as the general term.
 Fool's mate – also known as the Two-Move Checkmate, it is the quickest possible checkmate in chess. A prime example consists of the moves: 1.f3 e5 2.g4 Qh4#
 Scholar's mate – checkmate achieved by the moves: 1.e4 e5 2.Qh5 Nc6 3.Bc4 Nf6? 4.Qxf7#. The moves might be played in a different order or in slight variation, but the basic idea is the same: the queen and bishop combine in a simple mating attack on f7 (or f2 if Black is performing the mate).
 Smothered mate – checkmate delivered by a knight in which the mated king is unable to move because he is surrounded (or smothered) by his own pieces.
 Back rank checkmate – checkmate delivered by a rook or queen along a back rank (that is, the row on which the pieces (not pawns) stand at the start of the game) in which the mated king is unable to move up the board because the king is blocked by friendly pieces (usually pawns) on the second rank (Burgess 2009:16).
 Boden's mate – checkmating pattern in chess characterized by bishops on two criss-crossing diagonals (for example, bishops on a6 and f4 delivering mate to a king on c8), with possible flight squares for the king being occupied by friendly pieces. Most often the checkmated king has castled queenside, and is mated on c8 or c1.
 Epaulette mate – checkmate where two parallel retreat squares for a checked king are occupied by his own pieces, preventing his escape. The most common Epaulette mate involves the king on his back rank, trapped between two rooks.
 Légal's mate – chess opening trap, characterized by a queen sacrifice followed by checkmate with minor pieces if Black accepts the sacrifice. The trap is named after the French player Sire de Légal (1702–1792).
 Chess Informant
 Chess opening theory table
 Encyclopaedia of Chess Openings
 Gambit – sacrifice of material (usually a pawn) to gain a positional advantage (usually faster development of pieces)
 List of chess openings
 List of chess openings named after people
 List of chess openings named after places

e4 Openings 
 King's Pawn Game – Games that start with White moving 1.e4.
 Open Game – Games that start with 1.e4 followed by 1...e5 by Black.
 Semi-Open Game – Games that start with 1.e4 followed by a move other than 1...e5 by Black.

King's Knight Openings 

King's Knight Opening –
 Damiano Defense
 Elephant Gambit
 Evans Gambit
 Four Knights Game
 Giuoco Piano
 Greco Defense
 Gunderam Defense
 Halloween Gambit
 Hungarian Defense
 Inverted Hungarian Opening
 Irish Gambit
 Italian Gambit
 Italian Game
 Italian Game, Blackburne Shilling Gambit
 Jerome Gambit
 Konstantinopolsky Opening
 Latvian Gambit
 Petrov's Defense
 Philidor Defense
 Ponziani Opening
 Rousseau Gambit
 Ruy Lopez
 Ruy Lopez, Exchange Variation
 Scotch Game
 Three Knights Opening
 Two Knights Defense
 Two Knights Defense, Fried Liver Attack

Sicilian Defense 

Sicilian Defense –
 Chekhover Sicilian
 Sicilian Defense, Accelerated Dragon
 Sicilian Defense, Alapin Variation
 Sicilian Defense, Dragon Variation
 Sicilian Defense, Najdorf Variation
 Sicilian Defense, Scheveningen Variation
 Sicilian, Dragon, Yugoslav attack, 9.Bc4
 Smith–Morra Gambit
 Wing Gambit

Other e4 opening variations 

 Alapin's Opening
 Alekhine's Defense
 Balogh Defense
 Bishop's Opening
 Bongcloud Attack
 Caro–Kann Defense
 Center Game
 Danish Gambit
 Falkbeer Countergambit
 Fischer Defense
 Frankenstein–Dracula Variation
 French Defense
 King's Gambit
 Centre Pawn Opening
 Modern Defense
 Monkey's Bum
 Napoleon Opening
 Nimzowitsch Defense
 Owen's Defense
 Pirc Defense
 Pirc Defense, Austrian Attack
 Portuguese Opening
 Rice Gambit
 Scandinavian Defense
 St. George Defense
 Vienna Game
 Wayward Queen Attack

d4 Openings 
 Queen's Pawn Game
 Closed Game
 Semi-Closed Game

Queen's Gambit Openings 

 Queen's Gambit –
 Queen's Gambit Accepted
 Queen's Gambit Declined
 Albin Countergambit
 Baltic Defense
 Cambridge Springs Defense
 Chigorin Defense
 Marshall Defense
 Semi-Slav Defense
 Slav Defense
 Symmetrical Defense
 Tarrasch Defense

Indian Defense 

Indian Defense –
 Black Knights' Tango
 Bogo-Indian Defense
 Budapest Gambit
 East Indian Defense
 Grünfeld Defense
 Grünfeld Defense, Nadanian Variation
 King's Indian Defense
 King's Indian Defense, Four Pawns Attack
 Neo-Indian Attack
 Nimzo-Indian Defense
 Old Indian Defense
 Queen's Indian Defense
 Torre Attack
 Trompowsky Attack

Other d4 opening variations 

 Alapin–Diemer Gambit
 Benko Gambit
 Benoni Defense
 Blackmar–Diemer Gambit
 Blumenfeld Gambit
 Catalan Opening
 Diemer–Duhm Gambit
 Dutch Defense
 English Defense
 Englund Gambit
 Keres Defense
 London System
 Queen's Knight Defense
 Polish Defense
 Richter–Veresov Attack
 Staunton Gambit
 Wade Defense

Flank openings 

 Benko's Opening
 Bird's Opening
 English Opening
 Flank opening
 Larsen's Opening
 Réti Opening
 Zukertort Opening
 Réti Opening, King's Indian Attack

Irregular Openings 

 Amar Opening
 Anderssen's Opening
 Barnes Opening
 Clemenz Opening
 Desprez Opening
 Dunst Opening
 Durkin Opening
 Grob's Attack
 Irregular chess opening
 Mieses Opening
 Saragossa Opening
 Sokolsky Opening
 Van 't Kruijs Opening
 Ware Opening

Openings including a trap 

 Fool's mate
 Scholar's mate
 Elephant Trap
 Halosar Trap
 Kieninger Trap
 Lasker Trap
 Légal Trap
 Magnus Smith Trap
 Marshall Trap
 Monticelli Trap
 Mortimer Trap
 Noah's Ark Trap
 Rubinstein Trap
 Siberian Trap
 Tarrasch Trap
 Würzburger Trap

Endgames 
Endgame – phase of the game after the middlegame when there are few pieces left on the board
 Checkmate patterns – Patterns of checkmate that occur reasonably often.
 Chess endgame literature – Literature on chess endgames.
 Endgame maneuvers
 Prokeš maneuver – maneuver from an endgame study that sometimes occurs in games.
 Endgame positions
 Endgame study – A composed position with a goal of either winning or drawing
 Réti endgame study – endgame study illustrate how a king can pursue two goals at the same time.
 Saavedra position – endgame study in which a surprising underpromotion leads to a win.
 Particular endgame situations
 Bare king – situation in which one player has only the king left on the board.
 Fortress – position in which a player with weaker material is able to keep the stronger side at bay and draw the game instead of lose it.
 King and pawn versus king endgame – fundamental endgame with a king and pawn versus a king.
 Key square – square that a player needs to occupy (usually by the king in a king and pawn endgame) to achieve some goal.
 Opposite-colored bishops endgame – Endgames in which each side has one bishop and the bishops are on opposite colors of the board.
 Opposition – When two kings face each other with one square in between (with generalizations).
 Pawnless chess endgame – Endgames without pawns.
 Queen and pawn versus queen endgame – difficult endgame with a queen and pawn versus a queen.
 Queen versus pawn endgame – fundamental endgame with a queen versus an advanced pawn protected by its king.
 Rook and bishop versus rook endgame – well-studied endgame with a rook and bishop versus a rook.
 Rook and pawn versus rook endgame – fundamental and well-studied endgame with a rook and pawn versus a rook.
 Lucena position – one of the most famous and important positions in chess endgame theory, where if the side with the pawn can reach this type of position, he can forcibly win the game.
 Philidor position – if the side without the pawn reaches the Philidor Position, he will force a draw.
 Two knights endgame – endgame with two knights versus a lone king cannot force checkmate, but they may be able to force a win if the defender has a pawn.
 Wrong bishop – situation in some endgames where a player's bishop is on the wrong color of square to accomplish something, i.e. the result would be different if the bishop was on the other color.
 Wrong rook pawn – an endgame situation very closely related to the wrong bishop, where having the other rook pawn would have a different result.
 Endgame principles
 Tarrasch rule – guideline that rooks should usually be placed behind passed pawns – both its own pawns and the opponent's.
 Endgame tablebase – computer database of endgame positions giving optimal moves for both sides and the result of optimal moves (a win for one player or a draw).

Venues (who and where to play)

Casual play

Chess clubs 
 Chess club

Online chess 
 Internet chess server
 Chess.com
 RedhotPawn.com
 Schemingmind.com
 GameKnot.com
 Lichess.org (Open source)
 Playchess (Chessbase.com)
 chess24.com

Correspondence chess 
 Correspondence chess –
 Correspondence chess server – arguably the most convenient form of correspondence chess.

Competitive chess 
 Chess around the world –
 Chess rating system – dynamic rating system based on a player's performance, with a higher number indicating a better player.
 Chess tournament – chess competition among several to many players.
 Swiss-system tournament – A tournament format designed to handle a relatively large number of players playing a small number of rounds in a relatively short time.
 Round-robin tournament – A tournament format for a small to moderate number of players in which each player plays each other table. It may be lengthy, depending on the number of rounds played.
 Knockout tournament – A tournament format of several stages in which players are paired off and half are eliminated in each stage.
 Internet Computer Chess Tournament – tournament for chess engines held over the Internet.
 FIDE World Rankings – list of the highest-rated players in the world.
 Simultaneous exhibition – demonstration in which one player plays against a large number of opponents simultaneously.

Titles
Chess title –
Grandmaster – the highest title other than World Champion
International Master – lower title than Grandmaster
FIDE Master – lower title than International Master
Candidate Master – Lower title than FIDE Master
Chess expert – A title awarded by the United States Chess Federation to players of below master strength
Woman Grandmaster – Available to women only, lower requirements than Grandmaster
Woman International Master – Available to women only, lower requirements than International Master
Woman FIDE Master – Available to women only, lower requirements than FIDE Master
Woman Candidate Master – Available to women only, lower requirements than Candidate Master
International Correspondence Chess Grandmaster – The highest title awarded by the International Correspondence Chess Federation
FIDE titles – lifetime titles awarded by FIDE

Computer chess 
Computer chess –
 Chess engine –
 Human–computer chess matches –
 Internet chess server –
 Chess software –

History of chess 
History of chess
 Shatranj – old form of chess, from which modern chess gradually developed, that came to the Western world from India via Sassanid Persia.
 Romantic chess –
 Café de la Régence –
 Human–computer chess matches –
 Deep Blue (chess computer) –
 Deep Blue versus Garry Kasparov
 Deep Blue – Kasparov, 1996, Game 1
 Deep Blue – Kasparov, 1997, Game 6
Online chess

Famous games
Immortal Game
Immortal losing game
Immortal Zugzwang Game
Immortal Draw
Evergreen game
Polish Immortal
Peruvian Immortal
The Game of the Century
Lasker versus Bauer, Amsterdam, 1889
Morphy versus the Duke of Brunswick and Count Isouard (the Opera Game)
Kasparov versus the World
Poole versus HAL 9000
more...

History of chess, by period 
Timeline of chess

Years in chess 

 1914 in chess
 1915 in chess
 1916 in chess
 1917 in chess
 1918 in chess
 1932 in chess
 1933 in chess
 1939 in chess
 1940 in chess
 1941 in chess
 1942 in chess
 1943 in chess
 1944 in chess
 1945 in chess
 1962 in chess

 1969 in chess
 1970 in chess
 1971 in chess
 1972 in chess
 1973 in chess
 1974 in chess
 1975 in chess
 1976 in chess
 1988 in chess
 1989 in chess
 1990 in chess
 1991 in chess
 1992 in chess
 1993 in chess
 1994 in chess

 1995 in chess
 1996 in chess
 1997 in chess
 1998 in chess
 1999 in chess
 2000 in chess
 2001 in chess
 2002 in chess
 2003 in chess
 2004 in chess
 2005 in chess
 2006 in chess
 2007 in chess
 2008 in chess
 2009 in chess
 2010 in chess
 2011 in chess
 2012 in chess
 2013 in chess
 2014 in chess
 2015 in chess
 2016 in chess
 2017 in chess
 2018 in chess
 2019 in chess
 2020 in chess

Chess players 
 Chess prodigy – child who plays chess so well as to be able to beat Masters and even Grandmasters, often at a very young age.
 List of chess families
 List of chess grandmasters
 List of chess players
 Comparison of top chess players throughout history
 World chess championship

World Chess Championships

 World Chess Championship 1886
 World Chess Championship 1889
 World Chess Championship 1891
 World Chess Championship 1892
 World Chess Championship 1894
 World Chess Championship 1897
 World Chess Championship 1907
 World Chess Championship 1908
 World Chess Championship 1910 (Lasker–Janowski)
 World Chess Championship 1910 (Lasker–Schlechter)
 World Chess Championship 1921
 World Chess Championship 1927
 World Chess Championship 1929
 World Chess Championship 1934
 World Chess Championship 1935
 World Chess Championship 1937
 World Chess Championship 1948
 World Chess Championship 1951
 World Chess Championship 1954
 World Chess Championship 1957
 World Chess Championship 1958
 World Chess Championship 1960
 World Chess Championship 1961
 World Chess Championship 1963
 World Chess Championship 1966
 World Chess Championship 1969
 World Chess Championship 1972
 World Chess Championship 1975
 World Chess Championship 1978
 World Chess Championship 1981
 World Chess Championship 1984
 World Chess Championship 1985
 World Chess Championship 1986
 World Chess Championship 1987
 World Chess Championship 1990
 World Chess Championship 1993
 Classical World Chess Championship 1995
 Classical World Chess Championship 2000
 Classical World Chess Championship 2004
 FIDE World Chess Championship 1996
 FIDE World Chess Championship 1998
 FIDE World Chess Championships 1998–2004
 FIDE World Chess Championship 1999
 FIDE World Chess Championship 2000
 FIDE World Chess Championship 2002
 FIDE World Chess Championship 2004
 FIDE World Chess Championship 2005
 World Chess Championship 2006
 World Chess Championship 2007
 World Chess Championship 2008
 World Chess Championship 2010
 World Chess Championship 2012
 World Chess Championship 2013
 World Chess Championship 2014
 World Chess Championship 2016
 World Chess Championship 2018
 World Chess Championship 2021
 Women's World Chess Championship
 List of chess world championship matches
 World Amateur Chess Championship
 Candidates Tournament
 World Championship of Chess Composition
 World Computer Chess Championship
 World Computer Speed Chess Championship
 Interregnum of World Chess Champions
 Interzonal
 World Junior Chess Championship
 World Senior Chess Championship
 World Chess Solving Championship
 World Team Chess Championship
 World Youth Chess Championship

Science of chess

Psychology and chess 
 Chess blindness –
 Chess as mental training –
 Chess therapy –

Chess programming 
 Board representation –
 Chess engine –
 Minimax –
 Null-move heuristic –
 Portable Game Notation –
 Transposition table –
 Endgame tablebase –

Chess theory 
Chess theory –
 First-move advantage in chess –
 Chess opening theory table –
 Chess problem –
 Chess composer –
 Endgame study –
 Glossary of chess problems –
 Motif (chess composition) –
 Rundlauf –
 Types of chess problems
Directmates – White to move first and checkmate Black within a specified number of moves against any defense. These are often referred to as "mate in n", where n is the number of moves within which mate must be delivered. In composing and solving competitions, directmates are further broken down into three classes:
Two-movers – White to move and checkmate Black in two moves against any defense.
Three-movers – White to move and checkmate Black in no more than three moves against any defense.
More-movers – White to move and checkmate Black in n moves against any defense, where n is some particular number greater than three.
 Fairy chess – chess problems that differ from classical (also called orthodox) chess problems in that they are not direct mates. Although the term "fairy chess" is sometimes used for games, it is usually applied to problems with new stipulations, new rules, a new board, or fairy chess pieces, to express an idea or theme impossible in "orthochess". See also the section on chess variants, below.
Helpmates – Black to move first cooperates with White to get Black's own king mated in a specified number of moves.
Selfmates – White moves first and forces Black (in a specified number of moves) to checkmate White.
Helpselfmates – White to move first cooperates with Black to get a position of selfmate in one move.
Reflexmates – form of selfmate with the added stipulation that each side must give mate if it is able to do so. (When this stipulation applies only to Black, it is a semi-reflexmate.)
Seriesmovers – one side makes a series of moves without reply to achieve a stipulated aim. Check may not be given except on the last move. A seriesmover may take various forms:
Seriesmate – directmate with White playing a series of moves without reply to checkmate Black.
Serieshelpmate – helpmate in which Black plays a series of moves without reply after which White plays one move to checkmate Black.
Seriesselfmate – selfmate in which White plays a series of moves leading to a position in which Black is forced to give mate.
Seriesreflexmate – reflexmate in which White plays a series of moves leading to a position in which Black can, and therefore must, give mate.
 Chess puzzle –
 Joke chess problem –
 Combinatorial game theory
 Solving chess –
 Retrograde analysis –

Chess in culture 
 Chess aesthetics
 Chess in the arts
 Chess game collections
 Chess libraries
 Chess media
 Chess in popular media
 Chess organizations
 Chess venues (who and where to play)
 Chess variants

Chess media 
 Chess columns in newspapers –
 Chess endgame literature –
 Chess libraries

Chess essays 
 The Morals of Chess, by Benjamin Franklin

Chess video games

 Battle Chess
 Chessmaster
 Fritz

Chess books
 A History of Chess
 Basic Chess Endings
 Chess endgame literature
 Chess opening book
 Encyclopedia of Chess Openings
 Göttingen manuscript
 Handbuch des Schachspiels
 Lasker's Manual of Chess
 Modern Chess Openings
 My 60 Memorable Games
 My Great Predecessors
 My System
 The Game and Playe of the Chesse
 The Game of Chess
 The Oxford Companion to Chess
 more...

Periodicals
 British Chess Magazine
 Chess Informant
 Chess Life
 CHESS magazine
 EG
 New In Chess
 Shakhmatny Bulletin
 Shakhmaty v SSSR
 The Week in Chess
 64
 more...

Chess websites 
 ChessCafe.com – publishes endgame studies, book reviews and other articles related to chess on a weekly basis. It was founded in 1996 by Hanon Russell, and is well known as a repository of articles about chess and its history.
 Chessgames.com – Internet chess community with over 197,000 members. The site maintains a large database of chess games, where each game has its own discussion page for comments and analysis.
 FIDE Online Arena – Fédération internationale des échecs or World Chess Federation's (FIDE) commercial Internet chess server devoted to chess playing and related activities.
 Internet chess servers – websites that allow players to play each other online
 Free Internet Chess Server – volunteer-run Internet chess server. It was organized as a free alternative to the Internet Chess Club (ICC), after that site began charging for membership.
 Internet Chess Club – commercial Internet chess server devoted to the play and discussion of chess and chess variants.
 Playchess – commercial Internet chess server edited by ChessBase devoted to the play and discussion of chess and chess variants.
 SchemingMind – privately owned international correspondence chess club founded in 2002. Most games and tournaments are played on a correspondence chess server owned by the club for this purpose.
 The Week in Chess – one of the first, if not the first, Internet-based chess news services.

Chess in popular media 
 Chess in the arts and literature
 Chess in early literature

Chess-themed movies 
 Knight Moves
 Pawn Sacrifice
 Searching for Bobby Fischer

Chess organizations 
 FIDE
 Professional Chess Association

Some influential chess persons 

 Paul Morphy – (June 22, 1837 – July 10, 1884) – American chess player. He is considered to have been the greatest chess master of his era and an unofficial World Chess Champion. He was called "The Pride and Sorrow of Chess" because he had a brief and brilliant chess career, retiring from the game at the age of 21.
Wilhelm (later William) Steinitz (May 17, 1836 – August 12, 1900) – Austrian and then American chess player and the first undisputed world chess champion from 1886 to 1894. From the 1870s onwards, commentators have debated whether Steinitz was effectively the champion earlier.
 Emanuel Lasker (December 24, 1868 – January 11, 1941) – was a German chess player, mathematician, and philosopher who was the second formally recognized World Chess Champion, a position from which he dominated chess for 27 years (from 1894 to 1921).
 José Raúl Capablanca (19 November 1888 – 8 March 1942) – Cuban chess player who was world chess champion from 1921 to 1927. Nicknamed the "Human Chess Machine" due to his mastery over the board and his relatively simple style of play, he was renowned for his exceptional endgame skill and speed of play, and is widely regarded as the most naturally talented chess player in history.
 15 Founders of FIDE – established FIDE on July 20, 1924, at the 1st unofficial Chess Olympiad.
 Alexander Alekhine (October 31, 1892 – March 24, 1946) – in 1927, he became the fourth World Chess Champion by defeating Capablanca, widely considered invincible, in what would stand as the longest chess championship match held until 1985. Alekhine is highly regarded as a chess writer and theoretician, producing innovations in a wide range of chess openings, and giving his name to Alekhine's Defense and several other opening variations.
 Mikhail Botvinnik (August 4, 1911 – May 5, 1995) – Soviet and Russian International Grandmaster and three-time World Chess Champion. Working as an electrical engineer and computer scientist at the same time, he was one of the very few famous chess players who achieved distinction in another career while playing top-class competitive chess. He was also a pioneer of computer chess. He was World Champion from 1948 to 1963, with two interruptions. He briefly lost the World Championship to Vasily Smyslov and then to Mikhail Tal, but won it back from both of them in rematches.
 Mikhail Tal (November 9, 1936 – June 28, 1992) – Soviet-Latvian chess Grandmaster and the eighth World Chess Champion, widely regarded as a creative genius and the best attacking player of all time, known above all for improvisation and unpredictability. Every game, he once said, was as inimitable and invaluable as a poem.
 Vasily Smyslov – Soviet and Russian chess grandmaster, and World Chess Champion (from 1957 to 1958) known for his positional style, and, in particular, his precise handling of the endgame, but many of his games featured spectacular tactical shots as well. He made enormous contributions to chess opening theory in many openings, including the English Opening, Grünfeld Defense, and the Sicilian Defense.
 Tigran Petrosian (June 17, 1929 – August 13, 1984) – Soviet Armenian grandmaster, and World Chess Champion from 1963 to 1969. He was nicknamed "Iron Tigran" due to his almost impenetrable defensive playing style, which emphasized safety above all else.
 Boris Spassky (born January 30, 1937) – the 10th World Chess Champion and a prominent Soviet and, later, French player.
 Bobby Fischer (March 9, 1943 – January 17, 2008) – American chess Grandmaster and the 11th World Chess Champion. He is widely considered the greatest chess player of all time. Fischer was also a best-selling chess author.
 Anatoly Karpov (born May 23, 1951) – Russian chess grandmaster and former World Champion, a position he held from 1975 to 1985 and from 1993 to 1999, when he resigned his title in protest against FIDE's new world championship rules.
 Garry Kasparov – (born 13 April 1963) – Russian (formerly Soviet) chess grandmaster, a former World Chess Champion, writer and political activist, considered by many to be the greatest chess player of all time. He held the official FIDE world title from 1985 until 1993, when a dispute with FIDE led him to set up a rival organization, the Professional Chess Association.
 Viswanathan Anand (born 11 December 1969) – Indian chess Grandmaster. Anand has won the World Chess Championship five times (2000, 2007, 2008, 2010, 2012), and was undisputed World Champion from 2007 to 2013.
 Magnus Carlsen (born 30 November 1990) – Norwegian chess Grandmaster, former chess prodigy, and current World Chess Champion, who is the number-one-ranked player in the world. His peak rating is the highest in history as of 2021-01-02.
 more...

Some influential persons who played chess 
 Ben Franklin

Chess variants 

Chess variant – games similar to chess but with different rules or pieces.
 Fairy chess piece – pieces used in chess variants other than the usual pieces.

Variants with a different starting position 
 Displacement chess – starting position is slightly altered to negate players' knowledge of openings.
 Chess960 – variant created by Bobby Fischer, in which the starting position of the pieces on the 1st and 8th ranks are random, resulting in 960 possible starting positions. White and Black starting positions must be mirrored and king must start between rooks allowing castling.
 Transcendental Chess – similar to Chess960, except that there is no castling, starting positions are not necessarily mirrored, and bishops must start in opposite color squares. There are 8,294,400 possible starting positions.

Variants with different forces 
 Chess handicap – giving an advantage to a weaker player to allow equal chances of winning. Usually the advantage given is in material, extra moves or extra time.
 Dunsany's Chess – Black starts just as in traditional chess, while White starts with only 32 pawns. Black wins by taking all the pawns while avoiding stalemate, White wins by checkmating the black king.

Variants with a different board 
 Minichess – board has less squares, e.g. 3×3, 5×5, 5×6, etc.
 Los Alamos chess – 6×6 variant without bishops.
 Grid chess – 8×8 board with a 4×4 grid, dividing the board in 16 spaces of 2×2 squares each. Works just like traditional chess, except that a piece must cross at least one grid line at each move.
 Cylinder chess – played on a cylinder, which results in joining the right and left sides of the board.
 Circular chess – variant played on a circular board.
 Alice Chess – played with two boards, one of which starts empty. After the completion of each move, the piece that moved is transferred to the same square of the other board (after a move on the second board, the piece returns to the first board).
 Hexagonal chess – any of various variants played on a hexagonal board or board with hexagonal cells.
 Three-dimensional chess – any of various variants with multiple boards at different levels, resulting in gameplay in three dimensions.
 Star Trek Tri-Dimensional Chess
 Cubic Chess – pieces are replaced by cubes, with the piece figures on their sides, making easier to shift the piece types under special rules of promotion.
 Flying chess – played with two boards, one of which represents the upper level, the other the lower. Only some pieces are allowed to move on the upper level.
 Dragonchess – created by Gary Gygax, co-creator of the famed role-playing game Dungeons & Dragons, the pieces are inspired on characters and monsters from the fantasy RPG.

Variants with unusual rules 
 Losing chess – objective of each player is to lose all their pieces instead of checkmating the enemy king. Capturing, as in checkers, is compulsory.
 Atomic chess – whenever a capture occurs, the surrounding pieces are also captured, resembling the idea of an explosion.
 Three checks chess – a player wins by checking the opponent king three times.
 Extinction chess – the objective is to capture all of a particular type of piece of the opponent (e.g., both knights, all pawns, or the queen).
 Crazyhouse – a captured piece can be introduced back to the board by the player who captured it, as a piece of his own.
 Knight relay chess – pieces defended by a knight may move as a knight. Knights cannot capture or be captured.
 Andernach chess – after a capture, the capturing piece changes its color.
 Checkless chess – any move resulting in check is not allowed, except checkmate.
 Circe chess – captured pieces instantly return to their starting positions.
 Legan chess – starting positions of pieces are concentrated on opposite corners of the board. Pawn movement becomes diagonal and capturing orthogonal.
 Madrasi chess – whenever a piece is attacked by an enemy piece of the same type, it cannot move.
 Monochromatic chess – a piece may only move to a square of the same color as the one it occupies. Knights follow special rules for movement.
 Patrol chess – capturing and checking are not allowed unless the capturing or checking piece is guarded by a friendly piece.
 PlunderChess – capturing pieces gain a limited ability to move as the captured piece.

Variants with incomplete information and elements of chance 
 Kriegspiel – a player can see his own pieces, but not the enemy pieces.
 Dark chess – a player can only see the squares occupied by his own pieces and squares his pieces could move to.
 Penultima – spectators of the game secretly decide the moving and capturing rules for each piece, which the players gradually find out during the game.
 Dice chess – players roll dice before each move to determine which piece types may be moved.
 Knightmare Chess – fantasy variant published by Steve Jackson Games, including cards that change aspects of the game.

Multimove variants 
 Marseillais chess – each player moves twice per turn. If the first move gives check, the player doesn't make the second move that turn.
 Progressive chess – the number of moves played each turn increases progressively. White starts with one move, then Black plays two moves, then White plays 3 moves, etc.
 Avalanche chess – after each move, it is obligatory for the player to move an opponent pawn one square towards himself.
 Monster chess – Black plays as in traditional chess, but White has only one king and four pawns, and moves twice a turn.
 Kung-fu chess – a variant with no turns, pieces can be moved freely, each piece having its own delay time between two moves. A real-time strategy game, played mostly online.

Multiplayer variants 
 Bughouse chess – variant with four players and two boards, 2 vs 2, captured pieces by a player are transferred to his partner, who may introduce them to his board.
 Three-player chess – specially connected three-sided board for three players.
 Four-player chess – extended cross-shaped board for four players.
 Forchess – four player variant inside a regular board, with specific initial configuration.
 Djambi – 9×9 variant for four players with special pieces and rules.
 Bosworth – four player variant on a 6×6 board, pieces are put into play gradually as the game progresses.
 Enochian chess – four player variant with complex rules created by William Wynn Westcott, one of the three founders of the Hermetic Order of the Golden Dawn.

Variants with unusual pieces 
 Fairy chess piece
 Hippogonal
 Grasshopper
 Grasshopper chess
 Berolina chess
 Maharajah and the Sepoys
 Omega Chess
 Stealth Chess
 Pocket Mutation Chess
 Baroque chess
 Butterfly chess
 Chess with different armies
 Duell
 Gess
 Wildebeest Chess

Variants with bishop+knight and rook+knight compounds 
 Seirawan chess
 Janus Chess
 Capablanca Chess
 Capablanca Random Chess
 Embassy Chess
 Modern chess
 Grand Chess

Games inspired by chess 
 Arimaa
 Icehouse pieces
 Martian chess

Historical variants 
 History of chess
 Cox–Forbes theory
 Liubo
 Chaturanga
 Chaturaji
 Shatranj
 Abu Bakr bin Yahya al-Suli
 Tamerlane chess
 Hiashatar
 Senterej
 Lewis chessmen

Xiangqi and variants 
 Xiangqi
 Encyclopedia of Chinese Chess Openings
 Banqi
 Giog

Shogi and variants 

 Shogi
 Shogi strategy and tactics
 History of shogi
 Meijin
 Ryu-oh
 Computer shogi
 Shogi variant
 Micro shogi
 Minishogi
 Kyoto shogi
 Judkins shogi
 Whale shogi
 Tori shogi
 Yari shogi
 Heian shogi
 Sho shogi
 Cannon shogi
 Hasami shogi
 Annan shogi
 Unashogi
 Wa shogi
 Chu shogi
 Heian dai shogi
 Akuro
 Dai shogi
 Tenjiku shogi
 Dai dai shogi
 Maka dai dai shogi
 Ko shogi
 Tai shogi
 Taikyoku shogi
 Sannin shogi
 Yonin shogi
 Edo-era shogi sources

Other national variants 
 Janggi
 Makruk
 Sittuyin

Chess combined with other sports and pastimes
 Chess boxing
 Human chess
 Shot chess
 Strip chess

Chess variants software 
 ChessV
 Fairy-Max

Fictional variants
 Wizard's chess

See also 

 Glossary of chess
 Glossary of chess problems
 Hippogonal
 Morphy number

References

External links 

Predator at the Chessboard – A Field Guide to Chess Tactics – Learn chess tactics
 The Blue Book of Chess; "Teaching the Rudiments of the Game, and Giving an Analysis of All the Recognized Openings" by Howard Staunton
 ChessGames.com – online chess database and community
 Chess records – details of longest game, most passed pawns, fewest captures etc.
 A sample chess game

International organizations
 FIDE – World Chess Federation
Official rules – FIDE Laws of Chess
FIDE list of top rated players
 ICCF – International Correspondence Chess Federation
 ACP – Association of Chess Professionals

News
 Chessbase news
 The Week in Chess

Online play
 Chess.com Play Online Against Human Players
 ChessFriends.com
 Sparkchess

 
Chess
Chess